National Highway 148B  (NH 148B) starts at Kotputli, state of Rajasthan and ends at Bathinda, state of Punjab. The major towns are in succession of distance on this highway: Narnaul, Mahendergarh, Charkhi Dadri, Bhiwani, Hansi, Barwala, Bhimewala Tohana, Moonak, Jakhal, Bareta, Budhlada, Bhikhi , Mansa and Maur. This highway meets with National Highway 54 at Bathinda.

Route
The route of NH 148B passes through the following towns and villages: Kotputli, Narnaul, Mahendergarh, Charkhi Dadri, Bhiwani, Bawani Khera, Hansi, Barwala, Tohana, Jakhal Mandi, Moonak, Budhlada, Bhikhi, Mansa, Maur and Bathinda.

Junctions  

  Terminal near Kotputli.
  near Narnaul.
  near Narnaul.
  near Charkhi Dadri.
  near Bhiwani.
  near Bhiwani.
  near Hansi.
  near Tohana
  near Mansa.
  near Maur. 
  Terminal near Bathinda.

See also
 List of National Highways in India
 List of National Highways in India by state
 National Highways Development Project

References

External links
NH 148B on OpenStreetMap

National highways in India
National Highways in Haryana
National Highways in Rajasthan
National Highways in Punjab, India